The Oakville Beaver is a locally distributed community newspaper in Oakville, Ontario, Canada. It is published weekly by Metroland Media Group. The first edition of the Oakville Beaver was published on December 5, 1962 by W. (William) Kirk Simpson.

History
Timeline of predecessors

The Oakville Beaver has won the prestigious General Excellence Award in the top circulation Class (40,000 and over) in the Ontario Community Newspaper Association's (OCNA) Better Newspapers competition several times since 2006. In 2014, they won Best Front Page.

See also
List of newspapers in Canada

References

Further reading
 
 
 </ref>

External links
 Official website 

Weekly newspapers published in Ontario
Torstar publications
Oakville, Ontario
Publications with year of establishment missing